Barbadian singer Rihanna has released eight studio albums, two remix albums, one reissue, seven box sets and three extended plays. Since the beginning of her career in 2005, Rihanna has sold 60 million album units and 215 million digital tracks worldwide, making her one of the best-selling artists of all time. All of her albums have been certified platinum and multi-platinum in the United States by the Recording Industry Association of America (RIAA) and have totalled sales of over 10 million copies in the country.

Rihanna released her debut studio album, Music of the Sun in August 2005. It reached the top ten on the Canadian Albums and the US Billboard 200 charts; it was certified gold by the Recording Industry Association of America (RIAA) and sold over 623,000 copies in the country. As of 2015, Music of the Sun had sold over two million copies worldwide. The next year, she released her second studio album, A Girl like Me (2006). It topped the albums chart in Canada and reached number five on both the UK Albums and the US Billboard 200 charts. It was certified two-times platinum by Music Canada (MC), the British Phonographic Industry (BPI), and RIAA; it sold over four million copies worldwide. Good Girl Gone Bad (2007), Rihanna's third studio album, peaked at number two on the US Billboard 200 chart and was certified five-times platinum by RIAA in the United States and six-times Platinum by BPI in the United Kingdom. The next year, it was reissued under the title Good Girl Gone Bad: Reloaded (2008) with several new songs. It had sold over nine million copies worldwide, as of 2017.

Rihanna's fourth studio album, Rated R (2009), peaked at number one on the Swiss Albums Chart and sold over three million copies worldwide. It was also certified two-times platinum by both BPI and RIAA. Rihanna's fifth studio album Loud was released in November 2010. Loud peaked at number one on the UK Albums Chart and was certified six-times platinum by the BPI. The album was also certified three-times platinum in the United States and had sold over eight million copies worldwide. The next year, she released her sixth studio album, Talk That Talk (2011). It became Rihanna's third number one record in the United Kingdom and sold over one million copies in the country. It was also certified three-times platinum by the RIAA and sold over 5.5 million copies worldwide. 

Rihanna's seventh studio album, Unapologetic (2012) became Rihanna's first record to top the Billboard 200 chart and received a three-times platinum certification by RIAA. It also peaked at number one on the album charts in Canada, Ireland, Switzerland and the United Kingdom; it had sold over four million copies worldwide. She released her eighth album, Anti in 2016; it peaked at number one in Canada and the United States and was certified three-times platinum by the RIAA.

Studio albums

Soundtrack albums

Remix albums

Reissues

Box sets

EPs

Notes

See also
Rihanna singles discography
List of best-selling music artists
List of best-selling female music artists in the United Kingdom
List of Billboard Hot 100 chart achievements and milestones

References

External links

 Official website
 Rihanna at AllMusic
 
 

Discographies of Barbadian artists
Pop music discographies
Rhythm and blues discographies
Discography